Yiannakis "Yiannis" Xipolitas(born 10 April 1944) is a Cypriot former footballer. Xipolitas represented the Cyprus national football team twice.

References

1944 births
Cypriot footballers
Cypriot football managers
Olympiakos Nicosia players
Expatriate soccer managers in Australia
Living people
Association football defenders
Cyprus international footballers
Cypriot expatriate football managers
Cypriot expatriate sportspeople in Australia